Lo blanco y lo negro (English title: The white and black) is a Mexican telenovela  produced by  Ernesto Alonso for Televisa in 1989.

Ernesto Alonso starred as protagonist, while together Lupita D'Alessio and Elsa Aguirre starred as stellar performances.

Plot 
Ángel de Castro is one of the most powerful men in Mexico. He is married to Carolina, beautiful woman devoted to her home and children, that Angel would not change for anyone, but that does not stop taking the woman who pleases. Angel and Carolina are parents of Alicia, Alma, Armando and Andrés. The two men are on the verge of graduating: Armando, the first-born and the favourite, will be lawyer, and Andrés performs its social service in an agricultural field of experimentation.

Cast 

 Ernesto Alonso as Ángel de Castro/Silvio de Castro
 Lupita D'Alessio as Verónica Montes
 Elsa Aguirre as Carolina de Castro
 Marco Muñoz as Armando de Castro
 Mariana Levy as Alma de Castro
 Sebastián Ligarde as Andrés de Castro
 Omar Fierro as Raúl Alcázar
 Guillermo Murray as Guillermo Alcázar
 Rafael Amador as César Morelli
 Ana Luisa Peluffo as Odette
 Emilia Carranza as Raquel de Alcázar
 Rafael Sánchez Navarro as Roberto Olmedo
 Marcela Páez as Alicia de Castro
 Jorge Vargas as Julio Cantú
 Isabela Corona as Citalli
 Vicky de la Piedra as Felisa
 Miguel Manzano as Don Carlos
 Merle Uribe as Elena
 Felicia Mercado as Deborah Laval
 Oscar Bonfiglio as Javier Bautista
 Nailea Norvind as Selma Alcázar
 Mauricio Ferrari as Carlos Carvajal
 Mario Casillas as Ramón Ferreira
 Raquel Olmedo as Soledad
 Julio Ahuet as El Manoplas
 María Marcela as Irene O'Neal
 Fernando Robles as Jacinto Figueredo
 María Eugenia Ríos as Raymunda
 Roberto Cobo as Pepe Mateos
 Cecilia Romo as Cristina Carvajal
 Tony Bravo as Luis Soto
 Toño Infante as Cipriano Sánchez
 Mario de Jesús Garfiel as El Mudo
 Adalberto Parra as Esteban
 Carlos Cardán as Juan
 Cornelio Laguna as Samuel
 Ángel Carpinteyro as Jorge
 Ángeles Marín as María
 Clementina Gaudi as Esther
 Martha Patricia as Jeanette
 Ramón Menéndez as René Laval
 Héctor Sáez as Teniente Larios
 Felipe González as Jaime
 María Rojo as Andrea
 Gilberto Román as Tony
 Armando Sandoval  as Víctor
 Giovanni Korporal as Sr. Lewis
 María Regina as Marcia
 María Sarfatti as Dr. Ruiz
 Roberto Ruy as El Asesino
 Lucy Cantú as Clara
 Mario Sauret as Rey
 Lucía Castell as Consuelo
 Marina Marín as La Criolla
 Rigoberto Carmona as El Poeta
 Rossy Navarro as La Prieta

Awards

References

External links 

1989 telenovelas
Mexican telenovelas
Televisa telenovelas
1989 Mexican television series debuts
1989 Mexican television series endings
Spanish-language telenovelas
Television shows set in Mexico City